Style: Lessons in Clarity and Grace (also known as Style: Ten Lessons in Clarity and Grace and Style: Toward Clarity and Grace) is a book by Joseph M. Williams (1933–2008). Williams was a professor of English Language and Literature at the University of Chicago. The author says "it is good to write clearly, and anyone can".

About the book
The book was first published in 1981. The book has since gone through numerous editions and has become a popular text for writing classes. This book is based on a course, "The Little Red Schoolhouse,"  that Williams taught for many years at Chicago.

Content

Front Matter 
Preface

Part One: Style as Choice
Lesson One: Understanding Style  
Lesson Two: Correctness

Part Two: Clarity
Lesson Three: Actions  
Lesson Four: Characters  
Lesson Five: Cohesion and Coherence  
Lesson Six:  Emphasis

Part Three: Grace
Lesson Seven: Concision  
Lesson Eight: Shape  
Lesson Nine:  Elegance

Part Four: Form
Lesson Ten: Motivating Coherence
Lesson Eleven: Global Coherence

Part Five: Ethics
Lesson Twelve: The Ethics of Style

Back Matter 
Appendix: Punctuation  
Glossary 
Suggested Answers  
Acknowledgments  
Index

Editions in print

Style: Lessons in Clarity and Grace. 9th Edition. New York: Pearson Longman (2007)   (paper)
Style: The Basics of Clarity and Grace. 2nd Edition (2006)   (paper)
Style: Toward Clarity and Grace (1995)   (paper)

Earlier editions

Style: Ten Lessons in Clarity and Grace. Glenview, Ill.: Scott, Foresman (1981, 1985, 1989), New York: HarperCollins (1989, 1994), New York: Longman (1997, 2000, 2003), Toronto: Longman (2005), New York: Pearson Longman (2005)
Style: The Basics of Clarity and Grace. New York: Longman (2003)
Style: Toward Clarity and Grace. Chicago: University of Chicago Press (1990) with two chapters coauthored by Gregory G. Colomb

Translations 
 Korean: 스타일 레슨: 명확하고 아름다운 영어 글쓰기:  (2018)
 Chinese: 英文寫作的魅力: 十大經典準則: 人人都能寫出清晰又優雅的文章:  (2014)

On-line reviews 

Review of Style: Toward Clarity and Grace (1990) by J. Bradford DeLong 
Review of Style: Toward Clarity and Grace (1990) by Susan Stepney

Notes

External links 

Style: Toward Clarity and Grace at UoCP 
Style: Ten Lessons in Clarity & Grace, 1st. ed., at Amazon
Four steps to better writing, a handout prepared by Paul Dudenhefer based on Style: Ten Lessons in Clarity and Grace

2007 non-fiction books
Style guides for American English